Sanganeh (also Romanized as Sangāneh; also known as Sangāneh-ye Pā’īn and Sangunak ) is a village in Pasakuh Rural District, Zavin District, Kalat County, Razavi Khorasan Province, Iran. At the 2006 census, its population was 63, in 17 families.

References 

Populated places in Kalat County